This is a list of Indian I-League football transfers during the 2015–16 season by club. Only I-League transfers are included.

Aizawl FC

In:

Note: Flags indicate national team as has been defined under FIFA eligibility rules. Players may hold more than one non-FIFA nationality.

Bengaluru FC

In:

Out:

Note: Flags indicate national team as has been defined under FIFA eligibility rules. Players may hold more than one non-FIFA nationality.

East Bengal

In:

Out:

Note: Flags indicate national team as has been defined under FIFA eligibility rules. Players may hmoremore than one non-FIFA nationality.

Mohun Bagan

In:

Out:

Note: Flags indicate national team as has been defined under FIFA eligibility rules. Players may hold more than one non-FIFA nationality.

Mumbai FC

In:

Out:

Note: Flags indicate national team as has been defined under FIFA eligibility rules. Players may hold more than one non-FIFA nationality.

Salgaocar

In:

Out:

Note: Flags indicate national team as has been defined under FIFA eligibility rules. Players may hold more than one non-FIFA nationality.

Shillong Lajong

In:

Out:

Note: Flags indicate national team as has been defined under FIFA eligibility rules. Players may hold more than one non-FIFA nationality.

Sporting Goa

In:

Out:

Note: Flags indicate national team as has been defined under FIFA eligibility rules. Players may hold more than one non-FIFA nationality.

References

Transfers
Indian
Lists of I-League transfers